Koceljeva is a village and municipality located in the Mačva District of western Serbia. According to the 2011 census results, the population of the village is 4,182, while population of the municipality is 13,129.

Settlements
Aside from the village of Koceljeva, the municipality includes the following settlements:

 Batalage
 Brdarica
 Bresnica
 Galović
 Goločelo
 Gradojević
 Donje Crniljevo
 Draginje
 Družetić
 Zukve
 Kamenica
 Ljutice
 Mali Bošnjak
 Svileuva
 Subotica
 Ćukovine

Demographics

According to the 2011 census results, the municipality of Koceljeva has 13,129 inhabitants.

Ethnic groups
The ethnic composition of the municipality:

Economy
The following table gives a preview of total number of employed people per their core activity (as of 2017):

Gallery

Notable people
 Slobodan Santrač

See also
 List of places in Serbia

References

External links 

 Official website

Populated places in Mačva District
Municipalities and cities of Šumadija and Western Serbia